Randall Boe (born 1962) is the former General Counsel for AOL and has been involved in many notable cases regarding internet law. He was named the commissioner of the Arena Football League in March 2018. He was born in Ohio and grew up in Iowa City, Iowa. He attended the University of Wisconsin–Madison and graduated in 1983 with majors in political science and economics. He graduated from the University of Pennsylvania Law School in 1987. After graduation, he went to work at Arent, Fox, Kintner, Plotkin & Kahn in Washington, D.C. While at Arent Fox, Boe specialized in complex litigation and tried a wide variety of matters, including antitrust cases, white collar criminal matters and product liability matters.

Internet indecency litigation
In 1995, Boe agreed to represent Joe Shea, the publisher of the American Reporter, in a challenge to the recently passed Communications Decency Act (CDA). The CDA, among other things, made it illegal to publish, distribute or disseminate "indecent" material on the Internet. The "indecency" standard had long been imposed on over-the-air broadcasters, both radio and television, by the Federal Communications Commission; it was most famously defined and upheld in Federal Communications Commission v. Pacifica Foundation, a case determining that George Carlin's famous Seven Dirty Words monologue was indecent.

Boe was the lead counsel in Shea v. Reno, filed in federal court in New York at about the same time as the ACLU filed their challenge to the same statute in Philadelphia. A three judge panel, led by Judge José A. Cabranes, unanimously ruled in July 1996 that the Communications Decency Act was unconstitutionally vague and overbroad and enjoined its enforcement. The government appealed the decisions in both Shea v. Reno and ACLU v. Reno. Ultimately, the Supreme Court affirmed the judgements in both cases.

America Online
Immediately after concluding the Shea case, Boe was asked to join America Online's legal department to create an in-house litigation function. Over the next several years, Boe played a critical role in the development of Internet law. He led AOL's ground-breaking defense in Zeran v. America Online, Inc., the first time the immunity provisions of Section 230 of the Communications Decency Act had been invoked. The Zeran case was followed by victories in a number of other highly publicized defamation cases including Sidney Blumenthal's defamation lawsuit against AOL and Matt Drudge and Doe v. AOL.

Boe was also in the forefront of the legal battle against junk e-mail. Under his direction, AOL began filing a series of civil lawsuits, developing novel theories that would lead to the collection of millions of dollars in damages from spammers. Boe has testified before Congress on the issue and helped craft the tough Virginia Anti-Spam law, as well as the Federal CAN-SPAM Act of 2003. He favored strategies that imposed unacceptable costs on spammers, including the seizure of their assets. In 2003, Boe gave an AOL subscriber the keys to a Porsche Boxster that had been seized by AOL from a spammer.

Boe also played an instrumental role in a number of high-profile matters during the 1990s, including the massive litigation that resulted from the famous AOL Access Crisis of 1996 and 1997, settlements with State Attorneys’ Generals over marketing practices.  He was instrumental in helping AOL gain regulatory approval for the acquisitions of Compuserve in 1997, Netscape Communications Corporation in 1998 and Time Warner in 2000.  After the AOL-Time Warner merger closed in 2001, Boe was named AOL's General Counsel.  In 2001, on behalf of Netscape, Boe filed an antitrust lawsuit against Microsoft in connection with the famous Browser Wars.  Microsoft was eventually forced to pay more than $750 million to settle the lawsuit. In 2006, in the wake of the AOL search data scandal, Boe was asked by AOL CEO Jon Miller to lead a task force, along with Ted Leonsis, to investigate the matter and provide recommendations on improving AOL privacy policies. The recommendations of the task force led to Boe being named Executive Vice President for Consumer Advocacy at AOL in October 2006, when he stepped down as General Counsel of the company.

Arena Football League

Under the leadership of former Commissioner Scott Butera, the Arena Football League had contracted from 14 teams at the end of the 2014 season to four active teams by the start of the 2018 season. Two of the four remaining teams, the Washington Valor and the Baltimore Brigade, were owned by Ted Leonsis. Butera left the commissioner's office in March 2018, just before the 2018 season was slated to begin. Boe was named as his successor immediately after this. The Arena Football League shut down after the 2019 season, making Boe its last commissioner.

References

Living people
1962 births
American lawyers
AOL people
University of Wisconsin–Madison College of Letters and Science alumni
University of Pennsylvania Law School alumni
American business executives
Arena Football League commissioners